Wool is a surname. Notable people with the surname include:

Christopher Wool (born 1955), American artist
Dan Wool, American composer and sound designer
Glenn Wool (born 1974), Canadian stand-up comedian
John E. Wool (1784–1869), United States Army general
Rachel Wool, American Attorney.